Sarcotoechia is a genus of tropical rainforest trees, constituting part of the plant family Sapindaceae.

Ten to eleven species are known to science , found growing naturally in eastern Queensland, Australia, and in New Guinea.

Molecular phylogenetic studies challenge the limits of the genus.

Species
This listing was sourced from the Australian Plant Name Index, the Australian Plant Census, the Australian Tropical Rainforest Plants (2010) information system, original taxonomic research publications, Flora Malesiana and the Flora of Australia.
 Sarcotoechia angulata  – New Guinea
 Sarcotoechia apetala  – New Guinea
 Sarcotoechia bilocularis  – New Guinea
 Sarcotoechia cuneata  – NE. Qld endemic
 Sarcotoechia heterophylla  – Eungella range region, mid NE. Qld endemic
 Sarcotoechia lanceolata  – NE. Qld endemic
 – synonym: base name: Toechima lanceolatum 
 Sarcotoechia planitiei  – New Guinea
 Sarcotoechia protracta  – NE. Qld endemic
 Sarcotoechia serrata  – NE. Qld endemic
 Sarcotoechia villosa  – NE. Qld endemic

Accepted by the authoritative Flora Malesiana while awaiting formal description and publication, as a provisionally published name and description
 Sarcotoechia sp.  – New Guinea

References

Cited works 
 
 

 

Sapindaceae genera
Sapindaceae